Shining Knight (Sir Justin) is a fictional superhero appearing in American comic books published by DC Comics, the first of several to use the name Shining Knight. He was created by Creig Flessel and first appeared in Adventure Comics #66 (September 1941). He appeared regularly until issue #125, and off and on until issue #166.

The character appeared on the Justice League Unlimited animated series and the Stargirl live-action series, voiced by Chris Cox in the former and portrayed by Mark Ashworth in the latter.

Fictional character biography
Sir Justin, the newest member of the Knights of the Round Table in King Arthur's Court, was one of the many knights who had witnessed the death of Queen Guinevere's cousin, Sir Fallon. Fallon revealed his attacker to be the ogre Blunderbore in his last breath. Justin then vowed that he would avenge Fallon's death and search for Blunderbore in the northland. On his journey there, he met and freed the wizard Merlin, who was trapped in a tree previously by a witch. To thank Justin, Merlin transformed Justin's old, rusty armor into a golden, shining armor that was invulnerable and made his sword and shield invulnerable as well. Justin's sword was so powerful it could cut through anything. Merlin also gave him the pegasus Winged Victory, and made him invulnerable.

When he met Blunderbore at the top of the icy mountains in the northland, the two battled with Justin eventually winning and killing Blunderbore. Before he died, Blunderbore caused in vain an avalanche that buried Sir Justin and Winged Victory. Neither of them died, but instead were frozen in suspended animation. In our day, Justin and Victory were discovered and released from suspended animation by a museum curator. Realizing he must now live in the modern world, he decided to fight crime and evil with his skills as a knight, called by everybody the Shining Knight and soon took the civilian alias of Justin Arthur. He eventually met heroes like Crimson Avenger and Vigilante and, after meeting other heroes, they formed the Seven Soldiers of Victory. Later, Justin was invited to join the All-Star Squadron. When the JSA and the Squadron were captured by the time travelling villain Per Degaton, who was planning to change the events of Pearl Harbor to conquer the World, he was able to free himself using his sword, which assisted in the defeat of Degaton, though when Degaton went back to future these events were forgotten. Later, Sir Justin returned to  Britain where he served as the personal bodyguard to Sir Winston Churchill during the war in golden age, meanwhile in bronze age or modern age he served as the personal bodyguard to Queen Elizabeth II, and in same time is called by Merlin for some missions asked by King Arthur and Camelot. During his career as a superhero, he met a boy who looked up to him and vowed to be his sidekick, taking the name Squire.

Shining Knight also had a relationship with the second Firebrand, who was apparently killed by the Dragon King. In the last battle with his teammates in the Seven Soldiers of Victory, they fought a powerful energy creature called Nebula Man. When they finally defeated him, the energies released in the explosion of Nebula Man had caused each member of the Soldiers to be dispersed and lost in time. Sir Justin was thrown back to Asia during Genghis Khan's reign, losing his memory and wound up serving the Mongol leader. He, along with the other members of the Soldiers were eventually rescued by the Justice League and Justice Society.

After this, Sir Justin was amnesiac for quite some time and worked as a janitor at Blue Valley High School until his memories returned. He rejoined the remainder of the Seven Soldiers and got his revenge on the Dragon King. During this appearance, Shining Knight employed new high-tech armor which was voice-activated to expand and collapse and to end finally manages to defeats Dragon King.

During the events of Identity Crisis, Shining Knight assists Captain Marvel, Vixen and Firestorm during their battle with Shadow Thief. Shadow Thief steals Sir Justin's sword and uses it to stab Firestorm through the chest, resulting in the young hero's death. Shining Knight was anguished by Firestorm's death, a mystery will remain: that of Sir Justin got his sword back (merlin's credit) and managed to avenge Firestorm .

Shining Knight briefly appears in Justice League: Cry For Justice, where he is shown as one of the heroes recruited by Jay Garrick to help combat Prometheus.

In the pages of "The New Golden Age", Shining Knight was among the Seven Soldiers of Victory who got back together when summoned by the Jill Carlyle version of the Crimson Avenger.

Powers and abilities 
The Shining Knight is a master of the arts of combat of Arthurian times, invincible in both aerial combat, with weapons, and in hand-to-hand combat . Wearing his enchanted bulletproof armor he is invulnerable to everything. and wielding his enchanted sword, the Shining Knight can cut through almost anything and can resist magical attack. Having been Frozen for many years and hasn't aged at all, his aging has slowed down. The Shining Knight fighting against General Eiling has shown that he has the Indomitable Will that allows him to fight again despite the poorly reduced conditions. Some episodes and comics may have disclosed that the Shining Knight possesses superhuman strength, agility, dexterity, endurance, and reflexes.

His steed Winged Victory can fly.

Other versions 
Shining Knight and Winged Victory made a brief appearance in Elseworlds' JLA: Another Nail when all time periods meld together.

In other media

 Shining Knight appears in Justice League Unlimited, voiced by Chris Cox. This version is a member of the Justice League. In his most notable appearance, "Patriot Act", Sir Justin and several non-powered Leaguers fight General Wade Eiling after the latter turns himself into a monstrous super-soldier to eliminate metahumans. While his allies are almost killed during the fight, Sir Justin fights until his actions inspire a group of civilians to protect him, causing Eiling to realize he was the only metahuman involved in the fight and leave.
 Shining Knight appears in Stargirl, portrayed by Mark Ashworth. This version is a member of the Seven Soldiers of Victory and initially appeared as a janitor at Blue Valley High School. In the episode "Shiv Pt. 1", he uses his enchanted sword to save Stargirl from Cindy Burman. In the episode "Shining Knight", he receives recurring visions and seeks out Pat Dugan, Rick Tyler, and Beth Chapel for help. After hallucinating them as Dragon King and his drones, Pat talks Justin down and reveals to his allies the latter's true identity as Shining Knight. In the two-part season one finale, "Stars and S.T.R.I.P.E.", Justin assists the Justice Society of America in thwarting the Injustice Society's plans before leaving to find other surviving members of his team.

References

External links
 
The Shining Knight at Don Markstein's Toonopedia. Archived from the original on October 25, 2011.
 Earth-2 Shining Knight Index

Comics characters introduced in 1941
Arthurian characters
Arthurian comics
DC Comics fantasy characters
DC Comics titles
Fictional knights
Fictional swordfighters in comics
Golden Age superheroes
Mythology in DC Comics